This is a list of members of the South Australian Legislative Council from 1908 to 1910.

It was the third Legislative Council to be fully determined by provisions of the (State) Constitution Act 779 of 1901, which provided for, inter alia, a reduction in the number of seats from 24 to 18, realignment of District borders to encompass Assembly electorates, six-year terms (one half of the Council retiring every three years), and elections held jointly with the House of Assembly.

This parliament's scheduled term of 1908 to 1911 was cut short by a Constitutional crisis when Thomas Price died, and John Verran refused to negotiate a coalition government like the Price-Peake administration.

References
Parliament of South Australia — Statistical Record of the Legislature

Members of South Australian parliaments by term
20th-century Australian politicians